Coydalla is a genus of moths in the family Gelechiidae. It contains the species Coydalla interguttella, which is found in Borneo, Indonesia.

Adults are brownish cinereous, the forewings with two aeneous-brown bands, the second slightly abbreviated at each end, except towards its outer border. The intermediate space is purplish tinged, including an aeneous-brown cinereous-bordered dot. The marginal line is black, continued along the apical part of the costa. The hindwings are aeneous.

References

Gelechiinae